Tamara Savić-Šotra (born 24 July 1971) is a Serbian fencer. She competed as an Independent Olympic Participant at the 1992 Summer Olympics and for FR Yugoslavia at the 1996 and 2000 Summer Olympics.

References

External links
 

1971 births
Living people
Serbian female foil fencers
Olympic fencers as Independent Olympic Participants
Olympic fencers of Serbia and Montenegro
Fencers at the 1992 Summer Olympics
Fencers at the 1996 Summer Olympics
Fencers at the 2000 Summer Olympics
Serbian female épée fencers